Ohio's 23rd senatorial district has always been based in western Cuyahoga County, and includes the western third of Cleveland and some of Cleveland's western suburbs.  It encompasses Ohio House districts 13, 14 and 15.  It has a Cook PVI of D+12.  Its Ohio Senator is Democrat Nickie Antonio.  She resides in Lakewood, a city located in Cuyahoga County.

List of senators

References

External links
Ohio's 23rd district senator at the 133rd Ohio General Assembly official website

Ohio State Senate districts